Legerwood Kirk is an ancient and historic Church of Scotland church in the former county of Berwickshire, Scotland. The parish church at Legerwood serves a wholly agricultural community and there are barely any clusters of houses worthy of being known as a village.

History 

There has been a religious establishment at Legerwood since, at least, 1127 as John, a priest at Ledgaresude, as it was known, was a witness to a charter of that year. Walter de Lauder granted the church to the monks of Paisley Abbey in 1164 and they held the church and its tithes until the coming of the reformed church in Scotland in 1560. There is more mention of Legerwood in 1296 when the vicar, Walter, swore fealty to Edward I of England in 1296 at Berwick-upon-Tweed. The church still retains its original Norman chancel.

Noted minister 
The Reverend William Calderwood was minister at Legerwood from 1655 to 1709 but was evicted from his charge for 27 years for his refusal to conform to the Act of Glasgow – failure to preach with the Episcopalian prayer book as advocated by the Stuart kings in London Charles I and Charles II. William Calderwood died in 1709. In 1684 the congregation of Legerwood were fined for attending Conventicles. The minister's manse was not built until 1812.

See also
List of places in the Scottish Borders

References

Further reading
 The Borders Book, edited by Donald Omand.

External links 

 Parishes of Berwickshire
 Images of Legerwood from Geograph

Churches in the Scottish Borders
Churches in Berwickshire
Category B listed buildings in the Scottish Borders
Listed churches in Scotland